Krzyżewo may refer to the following places:
Krzyżewo, Podlaskie Voivodeship (north-east Poland)
Krzyżewo, Braniewo County in Warmian-Masurian Voivodeship (north Poland)
Krzyżewo, Ełk County in Warmian-Masurian Voivodeship (north Poland)